Vanailson Luciano de Souza Alves (born 25 April 1991), commonly known as Vaná, is a Brazilian footballer who plays as goalkeeper for Cypriot First Division club Aris Limassol.

After starting his professional career at Coritiba, he spent several years in Portugal with Feirense, Porto and Famalicão. He made 52 Primeira Liga appearances and played a small role in Porto's league title in 2017–18.

Career

Brazil
Born in Planaltina, Distrito Federal, Vaná was brought to Clube Atlético Paranaense in 2006. On his release in 2010, a former coach took him to Coritiba Foot Ball Club, where he was promoted to the first team in 2012.

Vaná was loaned to Canoas Sport Club in Rio Grande do Sul for the 2012 Campeonato Gaúcho and later that year joined Associação Chapecoense de Futebol on the same basis, being recalled to Coritiba due to their injury situation. He became known as "Vaneuer", a reference to German goalkeeper Manuel Neuer.

In the final of the 2015 Campeonato Paranaense, Vaná was blamed by the fans for both goals in a 2–0 first leg loss at Operário Ferroviário Esporte Clube, losing his place to Bruno Brigido thereafter. For 2016, he moved to ABC Futebol Clube in Natal, Rio Grande do Norte, where he won the Campeonato Potiguar and played a part in their promotion to the Campeonato Brasileiro Série B.

Feirense / Porto
Vaná moved to Portugal in 2016, signing for newly promoted Primeira Liga club C.D. Feirense. His performances in his only season at the Santa Maria da Feira-based club drew interest from S.L. Benfica, S.C. Braga – who bid €800,000 for him – and FC Porto, and he signed a four-year deal with the latter on 15 July 2017. He was back-up to Iker Casillas and made his debut on 12 May 2018 in the final game of the season away to Vitória S.C. with the title already secured (1–0 victory).

A year later, after the Spaniard suffered a heart attack, Vaná played the final three matches of the season, winning all of them as the title went to S.L. Benfica on the last day. He also played the 2019 Taça de Portugal Final on 25 May, a penalty shootout defeat to Sporting CP.

Famalicão
After the signing of Argentine Agustín Marchesín and promotion of youth player Diogo Costa, Vaná fell to third-choice goalkeeper at Porto and on 31 August 2019 he was loaned to fellow Primeira Liga team F.C. Famalicão for the season. Second choice to experienced compatriot Rafael Defendi, he made his debut on 30 October in a 2–1 home win over Gil Vicente FC. He played 23 total games for the club from Vila Nova de Famalicão, who fell short of a European place after a good start to the season.

On 2 October 2020, Vaná returned to Famalicão on a permanent transfer. He battled for a starting place against Russian Ivan Zlobin, and after a period of self-isolation due to COVID-19, the teenager Luiz Júnior.

Aris
Vaná left Portugal on 1 July 2021, when he joined newly promoted Cypriot First Division club Aris Limassol. He helped Aris finish 4th in the 2021–22 Cypriot First Division (tied for their highest ever placement in the league), and qualify for European football for the first time in the club's history.

Honours

Club

Coritiba
 Campeonato Paranaense: 2013

ABC
Campeonato Potiguar: 2016

Porto
Primeira Liga: 2017–18
Supertaça Cândido de Oliveira: 2018

References

External links

1991 births
Living people
Sportspeople from Federal District (Brazil)
Association football goalkeepers
Brazilian footballers
Associação Chapecoense de Futebol players
Canoas Sport Club players
Coritiba Foot Ball Club players
C.D. Feirense players
FC Porto players
F.C. Famalicão players
Aris Limassol FC players
Campeonato Brasileiro Série A players
Campeonato Brasileiro Série C players
Primeira Liga players
Cypriot First Division players
Brazilian expatriate footballers
Expatriate footballers in Portugal
Expatriate footballers in Cyprus
Brazilian expatriate sportspeople in Portugal
Brazilian expatriate sportspeople in Cyprus